Angelina Dehn (born 22 March 1995), better known by her stage name Ängie, is a Swedish pop and trap-hop artist.

Early life and career
Dehn was born in Stockholm and grew up in the town of Nynäshamn. 

She felt rejected by her friends after they learned of her first girlfriend. Dehn struggled with attention deficit hyperactivity disorder (ADHD) and mental health disorders in her adolescence and even contemplated suicide. She found relief in cannabis, saying it helped her get through her depression and get to know herself better. In 2018 she admitted that she used to be a drug addict, but has since given up on drugs, although stated in 2016 that "Weed [cannabis] is not really a drug to me. It helps so many people, with like Parkinson’s, and if you feel like shit, or you’re suicidal, it can help you so much. That’s the reason why I started smoking. I had like so low self-esteem. I’ve got ADD, I’m borderline, so it really helped me focus and get to know myself." 

After snapchatting clips of herself rapping to Death Team, they offered to produce her first single. She worked as a bartender, nursery teacher and window fitter before her single started getting attention. She was signed to Rich Parents AB, a division of Universal Music AB and her debut EP Suicidal Since 1995 was released in April 2018.

On 25 January 2019 she released as a single "IDGAF", described as "a bass heavy trap roller". It's the first song taken from Ängie's first studio album Everything Is Fake, set to be released as the following single.

A joint EP between Ängie and producer Harrison First called Each Other was released on 14 June 2019. A music video for the track "Bambam" directed by Ängie herself and frequent collaborator Christopher Nilsson was released on 21 June 2019, being premiered via Gaffa. The lead single of Heartburn, a joint album between Ängie and producer Tail Whip, a song called "Dust" was released on 22 November 2019 alongside its music video. The second single "Sad Sex" followed on 14 February 2020.

After the release of their collaborative EP, Ängie and Harrison First started working on a proper album. "Silver Sadness" served as the lead single and was released on 29 May 2020 along its music video, directed by Ängie herself and premiered a day before via Independent Music News. A music video for the track "Basic" was unveiled on the album's release date. It was directed by Jean-Luc Mwepu and co-directed by Ängie. The project called "Not Pushing Daisies" was released on 5 June 2020. Heartburn, on the other side, was finally released on 1 January 2021.

Ängie performed at WorldPride in August 2021.

She has said some of her inspirations include Tyler, the Creator, Lana Del Rey, Grimes and Wiz Khalifa.

Personal life
Dehn is bisexual. Her Suicidal Since 1995 album has been described as "an “open diary” to detail her early life and struggles with attention deficit hyperactivity disorder, family break-ups, suicidal thoughts, drugs, depression, and living as a bisexual in a “small-minded town”". Prior to her first song (Smoke Weed Eat Pussy) she spent years experimenting with art and poetry and socialising with fellow creatives in coffee shops.

She was described in 2017 by journalist Harriet Gibsone as, "an emblem of the liberal-minded revolution that is thriving online among teenagers and people in their early 20s. She is socially motivated, serious about her social media “art” and as committed to getting high as she is to creating a sense of community among those living in small towns as she once did."

She supports the legalisation of cannabis. When asked in an interview in September 2016, "Is that a message you want to get across with your music? Legalise weed?" She responded "After girl power, yeah."

Discography

Albums
 Not Pushing Daisies (with Harrison First) (2020)
 Heartburn (with Tail Whip) (2021)

EPs
Suicidal Since 1995 (2018)
 Each Other (2019)

Singles

Music videos

References

1995 births
Living people
20th-century Swedish LGBT people
21st-century Swedish LGBT people
21st-century Swedish women singers
Bisexual singers
Bisexual women
English-language singers from Sweden
Swedish LGBT singers
People from Nynäshamn Municipality
Swedish cannabis activists
Swedish pop singers
Trap musicians
Universal Music Group artists